Marco Valtulina (born 3 March 1988) is an Italian footballer .

Biography
Born in Lecco, Lombardy, Valtulina started his professional career at Pro Sesto. Since 2004–05 season he played for its top youth team, Berretti. He also played for F.C. Internazionale Milano in his early career, but as a defender. He was a member of Giovanissimi Regionali under-14 team in 2001–02 season.

After a season with the first team of Pro Sesto with 12 appearances, he was signed by Serie B club Torino in co-ownership deal for undisclosed fee. As part of the deal, Serhiy Predko joined Pro Sesto, also in co-ownership deal for undisclosed fee. He returned to Sesto San Giovanni on loan in 2008–09 season.

In June 2009 Torino acquired the remain 50% registration rights. He then sold to SPAL in another co-ownership deal for undisclosed fee in July 2009. He played 19 times in his third season in the third division. In June 2010, Valtulina returned to Turin. Valtulina joined Juve Stabia in July 2010, yet another co-ownership deal, signing a multi-year contract. He only played 15 games for the promotion playoffs winner. In June 2011 Torino gave up the remain registration rights to Juve Stabia and in July 2011 released by the Serie B newcomer.

International career
Valtulina had played for Italy Lega Pro representative teams in 2007–09 International Challenge Trophy, against Finland. He also played in 2008–09 Mirop Cup. In February 2009 he received a call-up from Italy Universiade team to prepare for the event, but he did not enter the final squad. He also dropped from the training camp in March.

Honours
 Campionato Nazionale Dante Berretti: 2008 (Pro Sesto youth)
 Coppa Italia Lega Pro: 2011 (Juve Stabia)

References

External links
 Football.it Profile 
 

Italian footballers
S.S.D. Pro Sesto players
S.P.A.L. players
S.S. Juve Stabia players
Calcio Lecco 1912 players
Association football forwards
Sportspeople from Lecco
1988 births
Living people
Footballers from Lombardy